Uganda competed at the 2020 Summer Olympics in Tokyo. Originally scheduled to take place from 24 July to 9 August 2020, the Games were postponed to 23 July to 8 August 2021, due to the COVID-19 pandemic. Since the nation's official debut in 1956, Ugandan athletes have appeared in every edition of the Summer Olympic Games, with the exception of the 1976 Summer Olympics in Montreal because of its partial support of the African boycott.

Medalists

Competitors
The following is the list of number of competitors in the Games.

Athletics

Ugandan athletes achieved the entry standards, either by qualifying time or by world ranking, in the following track and field events (up to a maximum of 3 athletes in each event):

Track & road events
Men

Women

Boxing

Uganda entered three boxers into the Olympic tournament. Shadiri Bwogi scored a box-off victory to secure a spot in the men's welterweight division at the 2020 African Qualification Tournament in Diamniadio, Senegal. Kavuma David Ssemujju (men's middleweight) and Catherine Nanziri (women's flyweight) completed the nation's boxing lineup by topping the list of eligible boxers from Asia and Oceania in their respective weight divisions of the IOC's Boxing Task Force Rankings.

Rowing

Uganda qualified one boat in the women's single sculls for the Games by topping the field in the B-final and securing the third of five berths available at the 2019 FISA African Olympic Qualification Regatta in Tunis, Tunisia, marking the country's debut in the sport.

Qualification Legend: FA=Final A (medal); FB=Final B (non-medal); FC=Final C (non-medal); FD=Final D (non-medal); FE=Final E (non-medal); FF=Final F (non-medal); SA/B=Semifinals A/B; SC/D=Semifinals C/D; SE/F=Semifinals E/F; QF=Quarterfinals; R=Repechage

Swimming

Uganda received a universality invitation from FINA to send two top-ranked swimmers (one per gender) in their respective individual events to the Olympics, based on the FINA Points System of June 28, 2021.

References

Nations at the 2020 Summer Olympics
2020
2021 in Ugandan sport